BODEGA is an American punk band from New York City, United States.

History
BODEGA's name comes from the name of a corner shop in New York City. They released their first full-length album in 2018, titled Endless Scroll. The album was produced by Parquet Courts member Austin Brown and released through record label What's Your Rupture?. In 2019, BODEGA released their first EP titled Shiny New Model.

Band members
 Ben Hozie – vocals, guitar
 Nikki Belfiglio – vocals
 Dan Ryan – guitar
 Adam See – bass guitar
 Tai Lee – stand-up percussions

Past members
 Montana Simone – drums
 Madison Velding-VanDam – guitar
 Heather Elle – bass

Discography
Studio albums
Endless Scroll (2018, What's Your Rupture?)
Broken Equipment (2022, What's Your Rupture?)

EPs
Shiny New Model (2019, What's Your Rupture?)

References

Punk rock groups from New York (state)
What's Your Rupture? artists